Hildegard Körner, née Ullrich (born 20 December 1959 in Urnshausen) is a retired East German middle distance runner who specialized in the 800 metres.

She competed for the sports club SC Turbine Erfurt during her active career.

Achievements

External links 

1959 births
Living people
People from Wartburgkreis
People from Bezirk Suhl
East German female middle-distance runners
Sportspeople from Thuringia
Olympic athletes of East Germany
Athletes (track and field) at the 1980 Summer Olympics
World Athletics Championships medalists
Recipients of the Patriotic Order of Merit in silver